Symbols of the Netherlands are items or symbols that have symbolic meaning to, or represent, the Netherlands.There  symbols are seen in official capacities, such as flags, coats of arms, postage stamps, and currency, and in URLs. They appear less formally as recurring themes in  literature, art and folk art, heraldry, monuments, clothing, personal decoration, and as the names of parks, bridges, streets, and clubs. The less formal manifestations may be classified as national emblems.

Official symbols

Flag

Coat of arms

Dutch orange lion
One of the symbols with which the Dutch associate themselves, is with a Lion called the Dutch Lion. The symbol is especially widely used with football.

National Anthem

Wilhelmus

Other

The colour orange has long been associated with the Netherlands due to Willem van Orange.

Other things commonly associated with the Netherlands include tulips, clogs, Gouda cheese and windmills.

 
Dutch culture